Jalamuru is a village in Srikakulam district of the Indian state of Andhra Pradesh. Jalumuru mandal is bordered by Narasannapeta, Sarubujjili, Saravakota and Kotabommali mandals of Srikakulam district.

Geography
It has an average elevation of 41 meters (137 feet).

Demographics
 Indian census, the demographic details of Jalumuru mandal is as follows:
 Total Population: 	60,200	in 14,153 Households
 Male Population: 	29,734	and Female Population: 	30,466		
 Children Under 6-years of age: 7,577	(Boys -	3,906 and Girls -	3,671)
 Total Literates: 	27,223

References 

Villages in Srikakulam district
Mandal headquarters in Srikakulam district